Joyoung Co., Ltd. is a Chinese manufacturer of home-use soybean milk machines, headquartered in Jinan, Shandong. The business was incorporated in 1994. As of 2009 it was China's largest soybean milk machine company. The company saw an increase in business after a tainted milk scandal in 2008. In May of that year it was listed on the Shenzhen Stock Exchange.

Soy milk is known as Chinese cuisine as well as one of the Chinese traditional breakfast drinks. Therefore, in the beginning, Joyoung Company mainly focused on soy-related appliances such as soy milk makers.

References

External links
  Joyoung

Companies based in Jinan
Chinese companies established in 1994
Chinese brands
Home appliance manufacturers of China
Companies listed on the Shenzhen Stock Exchange